The Court of Appeal of Tonga is the supreme court in Tonga for all criminal and most civil matters. It hears criminal and civil appeals from the Supreme Court and also hears appeals from the Land Court.

Jurisdiction
An appeal from the Supreme Court to the Court of Appeal can be made as of by right unless it is a civil matter and the amount in dispute does not exceed T$1000. Orders made by consent, orders regarding costs, and interlocutory decisions also cannot be heard by the Court of Appeal without leave of the Court.

An appeal from the Land Court to the Court of Appeal can also be made as of by right. However, matters relating to the determination of hereditary estates and titles are appealed to the Privy Council of Tonga.

The Court of Appeal can also deliver advisory opinions when specifically requested to do so by the monarch, the Cabinet, or the Legislative Assembly.

Structure
The Court of Appeal is headed by the Chief Justice of Tonga. The Chief Justice and the other Justices of Appeal are appointed by the Privy Council and are foreign nationals, usually from other Commonwealth jurisdictions.

Chief Justices
2019–present Michael Hargreaves Whitten
2015–2019 Owen Paulsen
2010–2015 Michael Dishington Scott
2006–2010 Anthony David Ford
2004–2006 Robin Maclean Webster
c.1998–2004 Sir Gordon Ward (2nd term) (Later Chief Justice of Turks and Caicos Islands, 2008}
1997–1998 Jack Lewis
1995–1997 Nigel Kenneth Hampton
1992–1995 Sir Gordon Ward (1st term)
1988–1991 Geoffrey William Martin
1985-1988 ?
1983–1985 Giles Harwood
1976-1983 ?
1973-1976 Henry Stead Roberts
1970-1973 ?
1968-1970 Ronald Knox-Mawer (jointly with Nauru)
1956–1968 Sir Clifford Hammett (jointly with Fiji)
1954-1956 David Blair Hunter
1953-1954 ?
1949–1953 James Beveridge Thomson (jointly with Fiji) (later Chief Justice of the Federation of Malaya, 1957)
1938-1949 ?
1936–1938 William Hemming Stuart
1936–1938 Ragnar Hyne
1930–1935 Charles Murray Murray-Aynsley
1925–1929 William Kenneth Horne
1917–1925 Sir Herbert Cecil Stronge
1905–? Robert Louis Skeen

References

Jennifer Corrin-Care, Tess Newton and Don Paterson Introduction to South Pacific Law (Cavendish Publishing Ltd: London, 1999).

External links
Tonga Court System Information, paclii.org
The Tongan Judicial, Tonga Government Portal

Tonga
Tonga
Law of Tonga
Government of Tonga